Hollick-Kenyon Peninsula or Kenyon Peninsula is an ice-covered spur from the main mountain mass of the Antarctic Peninsula, projecting over  in a northeasterly arc from its base between Mobiloil Inlet and Casey Inlet. It was discovered and partially photographed from the air by Lincoln Ellsworth on his 1935 trans-Antarctic flight from Dundee Island to the Ross Sea. In 1940 it was photographed from the air and charted from the ground by the US Antarctic Service.

The peninsula is named for Herbert Hollick-Kenyon, the pilot of Ellsworth's flight, whose demonstration of the practicability of landing and taking off an airplane in isolated areas constitutes a distinct contribution to the technique of Antarctic exploration.

References

Peninsulas of Graham Land
Bowman Coast